Berkshire Regional Transit Authority is a bus transportation system serving the City of Pittsfield and Greater Berkshire County, Massachusetts. It provides year-round bus service with connections to Amtrak at the Joseph Scelsi Intermodal Transportation Center (ITC).

Fares
All buses accept cash and CharlieCard. The current local fare, staying within a town or going to the next town, is $1.75 cash and $1.55 CharlieCard. The 3 or more towns fare is $4.50 cash and $4.00 CharlieCard. A 1-day pass is available for systemwide trips, and a 7 and 30 day pass is available for both trip lengths. Paratransit service is available with its own fares.

Schedule and Routes
Service is from Monday through Saturday. Service runs from 5:30 AM to 11:00 PM on weekdays and 7:30 AM to 7:30 PM on Saturdays. There is no service on Sundays or holidays except for President's Day and Patriot's Day.

References

External links

Berkshire Regional Transit Authority

1974 establishments in Massachusetts
Pittsfield, Massachusetts
State agencies of Massachusetts
Government agencies established in 1974
Bus transportation in Massachusetts
Transportation in Berkshire County, Massachusetts